Ardingly College is a fee-charging boarding and day school in the English public school tradition located near Ardingly, West Sussex, England. The school is a member of the Headmasters' and Headmistresses' Conference and of the Woodard Corporation of independent schools and as such has a strong Anglo-Catholic tradition. It was originally a boarding school for boys, and became fully co-educational in 1982. For the academic year 2015/16, Ardingly charged day pupils up to £7,710 per term, making it the 29th most expensive Headmasters' and Headmistresses' Conference (HMC) day school. It is a public school in the British sense of the term (i.e. fee-paying). As of 2017, there are about 416 pupils enrolled at the school, aged between 13 and 18. Additionally, there are about 520 pupils aged from 2½ to 13 at the Ardingly College Preparatory school, with which it shares some grounds.

The school is regularly positioned amongst the top ten International Baccalaureate (IB) schools in the United Kingdom, and has won the Royal Society of Chemistry Top of the Bench Competition, at the time captained by Thomas Hindle.

Ardingly played an important role in providing infantry throughout the 20th century conflicts, with around 1,200 Ardingly pupils going on to fight in the First World War, 146 of whom were killed, along with two former members of staff. In addition, 88 Old Ardinians died in World War II; their names being recorded in a book of remembrance.

The school's former pupils – or "Old Ardinians" – include four Conservative MPs; satirist Ian Hislop; actor Terry-Thomas; Formula One World Champion Mike Hawthorn; author Neil Gaiman; Interscan inventor John Paul Wild; and Allard Motor Company founder Sydney Allard.

History
Ardingly College was founded as "St Saviour’s College", Shoreham, in 1858 by Canon Nathaniel Woodard whose aim was to provide education firmly grounded in the Christian faith.

St Saviour's College opened on 12 April 1858, occupying the New Shoreham buildings in the lee of the churchyard of St Mary de Haura which had been vacated by another Woodard School, Lancing College, when it moved to its permanent home in April 1858. The site at Shoreham however was never intended to be permanent and it was left to Woodard to scour the South of England for a suitable permanent location for St Saviour's School.

In 1861 Woodard came across the 196 acre (0.79 km²) Saucelands estate at the southern edge of Ardingly village, which was acquired in 1862 for £6,000. Woodard employed Richard Carpenter as the school's architect, and the foundation stone at Ardingly was laid on 12 July 1864 by Granville Leveson-Gower, 2nd Earl Granville. St Saviour's College moved to the partially completed site at Ardingly on 14 June 1870 when the new school was officially opened by the Bishop of Chichester, with the inaugural sermon delivered by Samuel Wilberforce.

Today Ardingly occupies a 420-acre (1.7 km²) site situated in an Area of Outstanding Natural Beauty. Ardingly is divided into three autonomous schools, comprising a Pre-Preparatory School catering for pupils aged 2½ –7, Junior School catering for pupils aged 7–13 and Senior School for pupils aged 13–18. Both Junior and Senior Schools accommodate boarders who make up the majority of the Senior School student population. All Junior and Senior School students are assigned to a boarding house in which boarders live and study and where day-pupils have study areas. In all, the college has approximately 750 pupils.  According to the Good Schools Guide 2008, Ardingly College has admitted more pupils this year than at any point in its history and places are at a premium.

The college's Combined Cadet Force was established in 1902 in the wake of the Second Boer War. Around 1,200 Old Ardinians went on to fight in the First World War, 146 of whom were killed, along with two former members of staff; their names are recorded on the war memorial in the college chapel. In addition, 88 Old Ardinians died in the Second World War; their names are recorded in a book of remembrance in the crypt and on the memorial board in the Under.

In 1958, the school celebrated its centenary. On 9 June 1958, as part of the celebrations, the Queen and the Duke of Edinburgh visited Ardingly. A stone plaque on the terrace parapet commemorates the visit, where she "beheld the view". Later that week, on 14 June 1958, the then Prime Minister, Harold Macmillan, visited the school to open the Centenary Building, which comprises the college cricket pavilion and upstairs Centenary Room. On 8 May 2008, the Duke of Kent visited Ardingly as part of its sesquicentenary celebrations and officially opened a new teaching block at the pre-preparatory school. According to a Freedom of Information Request the school withdrew from the Teacher’s Pension Scheme on the 31st December 2020.

School terms 

There are three academic terms in the year:
 The Michaelmas term, from early September to mid December. New pupils are now admitted only at the start of the Michaelmas Half, unless in exceptional circumstances.
 The Lent term, from mid-January to late March.
 The Trinity term, from late April to late June or early July.

Similarly, there are five academic years:
"Shell", pupils in their first year at Ardingly (year 9).
"Remove", pupils in their second year at Ardingly (year 10).
"Fifth", pupils in their third year at Ardingly (year 11).
"Lower Sixth", pupils in their fourth year at Ardingly (year 12) which start studying for their A levels or IB.
"Upper Sixth", pupils in their fifth and last year at Ardingly (year 13).

Academic

In 2021, 91% of GCSE entries were awarded A* or A grades. Since 2001 Ardingly has offered the International Baccalaureate Diploma Programme to sixth-formers in addition to traditional A-Levels. 

In 2008 Ardingly was ranked 7th in the UK in The Independent's league table of schools offering both an A-Level and IB curriculum. In 2021, 82% of A-Level entries were awarded A* or A grades In 2021, Ardingly's IB students averaged 41.3 points, placing it 6th on the table of schools in the United Kingdom and 14th in the world.

Sport
Ardingly has several sports available to both prep students and college students. Athletics and cross country, cricket, football, hockey, netball, rounders, swimming, tennis, squash, and fencing are all open to prep students. The same set is offered for college students with the addition of badminton, rugby, basketball, rowing, yoga, shooting, scuba diving, and sailing, and the exception of rounders, cross country, and swimming.

Ardingly have won the Independent Schools Football Association Cup three times: in 1997–98, 2014–15 and 2015–16, only behind Millfield who have been proclaimed champions four times. It is also the first school in history to have won both the Elgin Southern League trophy and the ISFA Cup as well as being the second to have won two consecutive ISFA cups.

Chapel of St Saviour

The Grade II listed chapel bears the historical name of the school, being laid the foundation stone 12 July 1864. The architects were R. H. Carpenter and William Slater. The structures are in Gothic Revival style in red brick and tiled rooftops. The chapel possesses the east end of the mid block, having four bays each containing a glass-stained window of Decorated sort. It stretches out into a further two narrows east of the west wing. Over the rooftop there is a bell tower.

In 1976, cartoonist Nick Newman was expelled from Ardingly in his last term of Upper Sixth for wiring the Chapel to play rock music during a school Mass.

Houses

Headmasters

 1858–1894 Frederick Mertens
 1894–1904 Francis Hilton
 1904–1911 Herbert Rhodes 
 1911–1914 Marchant Pearson
 1915–1932 Thomas Wilson
 1933–1946 Ernest Crosse  
 1947–1961 George Snow 
 1962–1980 Christopher Bulteel  
 1980–1998 James Flecker 
 1998–2007 John Franklin 
 2007–2014 Peter Green 
 2014–          Ben Figgis

Ardingly College Lodge
The school has its own Masonic lodge, Ardingly College Lodge, which is a member of the Public School Lodges council. The lodge, which is open to male Old Ardinians as well as those with an affiliation to the college, was founded in 1922 by the then headmaster, Thomas Erskine Wilson, together with masters, the Provost of the school and the Bishop of Lewes.

Freemasonry at Ardingly takes its form from the Enlightenment in England during the 18th century, and shares characteristics with charitable organizations. It provides a common meeting place for Old Ardinian men with similar interests.

Combined Cadet Force

The Ardingly College Combined Cadet Force, or CCF, has existed in its various forms since 1902, with the outbreak of the Second Boer War. The Ardingly College CCF is split into six categories. These are Army, Royal Navy, Royal Air Force, Royal Marines, Drum Corps and Marching Band. The Army section is affiliated to the Princess of Wales's Royal Regiment, allowing cadets to take part in military and adventure training not readily available to non-cadets.

Ardingly Solar Car

Ardingly is one of the very few schools that take part in the World Solar Challenge, a biennial solar-powered car race in Australia. The school's students worked in the project for three years, achieving to complete the race 23 October 2015.

The current patron of Ardingly Solar is Prince Albert II.

Fees

As of the academic year 2020/21, Shell–5th boarding fees are £34,935 per annum while Shell–5th day fees are £23,985 per annum. Sixth form boarding fees are £35,865 per annum, while Sixth form day fees are £23,985 per annum.

Media coverage

The school was featured in the second episode of the BBC series Stiff Upper Lip: An emotional History of Britain, where the protagonist Ian Hislop returns to Ardingly, his former school, to describe his experiences there as well as the impact of the British public school system in shaping men in Victorian era.

Dinosaur findings

In February 2014, the BBC confirmed that several fossils had been discovered at the school grounds. The remains were found by staff and pupils during the construction of a new boarding house for girls. According to the Natural History Museum and Imperial College in London, some of these bones were around 140 million years old.

Notable alumni 

Notable former pupils include four former Conservative MPs, Private Eye editor Ian Hislop, actor Terry-Thomas, author Neil Gaiman, band leader Victor Silvester, Formula One World Champion Mike Hawthorn, and Crufts dog show founder Charles Cruft.

Fictional Old Ardinians include Tim Nice-But-Dim from The Nearly Complete and Utter History of Everything.

Southern Railway V Schools class

The school lent its name to the eighteenth steam locomotive (Engine 917) in the Southern Railway's Class V of which there were 40. This class was also known as the Schools Class because all 40 of the class were named after prominent English public schools. Ardingly, as it was called, was built in 1934 and withdrawn in 1962.

Further reading

Argent, N; Ardingly College 1939–1990. Autolycus Press (1991)
Gibbs, D; A School with a View: A History of Ardingly College 1858–2008. James & James Publishers Ltd (2008)
Letts, S; Ardingly: Its Building and Buildings. Old Ardinians Society (1985)
Perry, R; Ardingly 1858–1946: A History of the School. Old Ardinians Society (1951)

See also

List of SR V "Schools" class locomotives

References
Ardingly Green (#01613a), seal brown (#59260B) and mellow yellow (#FDEE00).

External links

Ardingly College website

Woodard Schools
Anglo-Catholic educational establishments
Educational institutions established in 1858
Member schools of the Headmasters' and Headmistresses' Conference
Boarding schools in West Sussex
Private schools in West Sussex
International Baccalaureate schools in England
 
1858 establishments in England
Church of England private schools in the Diocese of Chichester
Ardingly